LGBT tourism in Brazil is a form of niche tourism marketed to gay, lesbian, bisexual and transgender (LGBT) people who come to Brazil. The city of Rio de Janeiro was elected the best LGBT destination of the world, according to the U.S. Logo channel, owned by Viacom's MTV Networks. Rio de Janeiro also was elected the most sexy city of the world to LGBT people, according to the U.S. Logo channel and TripOutGayTravel. In 2014, Brazil and the United States were the two countries more wanted by international LGBT tourists, according to the World Travel Market.

Demographics
About 26% of visitors to São Paulo, Rio de Janeiro, Florianópolis, Salvador and Fortaleza are LGBT people. Brazil has more than 6,000 gay-friendly hotels and hostels registered in travel agencies and mainly specialized in the gay-oriented sites, which are the major source of information for travelers. The establishments receives a sticker with a rainbow, a global symbol of the gay movement.

Revenue
During the carnival of Rio de Janeiro in 2014, 30.75% of tourism revenue was from LGBT people. The total was R$1.5 billion, and 461 million of gays and lesbians. The majority of tourists in Brazil were from the states of São Paulo and Minas Gerais, and from other countries were the United States, United Kingdom, and Canada.

The Brazilian LGBT prides move millions in cash every year. Only the São Paulo Gay Pride Parade, with 3.5 million participants, attracts 400,000 LGBT tourists, that will yield to the coffers of the state, about $70 million euros or $160 million reais.

With highly educated, and willing to consume refined products, the gay community has become a priority for business of tourism and hotel sector in Brazil. Estimates suggest that this niche is responsible for annually inject nearly R$200 billion in the economy of Brazil. On October 21, 2010, was signed an agreement in the city of Rio de Janeiro, to encourage LGBT tourists coming to Brazil and increase the supply of destinations for this public in the domestic sector. The agreement was attended by Tourism Minister, the president of Embratur, and the president of the Association of gay tourism. The agreement, signed at the Fair of the Americas Abav (Brazilian Association of Travel Agents), provides incentives to qualified professionals working in the tourist service, actions to support marketing of products, services and destinations of the LGBT Tourism.

According to Out Now Consulting, in 2010, LGBT consumers residing in Argentina have spent a total of US$4 billion in leisure travel. In Mexico, LGBT consumers spent US$8 billion in leisure travel, while LGBT Brazilians spend more than US$20 billion in leisure travel, the largest in Latin America. The majority of foreign LGBT tourists in Brazil are U.S. citizens, British, Germans, French, and Dutch. According to the LGBT app Grindr, the city of Rio de Janeiro has the best gay beach of the world, and the city of São Paulo has the best gay parade of the world.

See also

 LGBT tourism
 Gay village
 LGBT marketing
 List of LGBT events

References

Brazil
Tourism in Brazil
LGBT in Brazil